Tso Chigma or Chandra Taal (meaning the Lake of the Moon), or Chandra Tal is a lake in the Spiti part of the Lahul and Spiti district of Himachal Pradesh, India. Chandra Taal is near the source of the Chandra River. Despite the rugged and inhospitable surroundings, it is in a protected niche with some flowers and wildlife in summer. It is a favourite spot for tourists and high-altitude trekkers. It is usually associated with Spiti, although geographically it is separated from Spiti. Kunzum La separates Lahaul and Spiti valleys.

Description
Chandra Taal lake is on the Samudra Tapu plateau, which overlooks Chandra river (a source river of the Chenab). The name of the lake originates from its crescent shape. Mountains of scree overlook the lake on one side, and a cirque encloses it on the other.

Access

Chandra Taal is a tourist destination for trekkers and campers. The lake is accessible by road from Batal and by road as well as on foot from Kunzum Pass from late May to early October. This  motor road runs as far as a parking lot  from the lake. One has to travel on foot for the final 1 kilometre. It takes approximately two hours from Kunzum Pass to Chandra Taal.

Fauna and Flora

There are vast meadows on the banks of the lake.  During springtime, these meadows are carpeted with hundreds of varieties of wild flowers.  In 1871, Harcourt, Assistant Commissioner of Kullu, reported that there was a plain of good grass to the north of Chadra Taal, where shepherds brought large herds for grazing from Kullu and Kangra.  Due to overgrazing, the grasslands are now degraded.

Chandra Taal is home to a few species such as the Snow Leopard, Snow Cock, Chukor, Black Ring Stilt, Kestrel, Golden Eagle, Chough, Red Fox, Himalayan Ibex, and Blue Sheep.  Over time, these species have adapted to the cold arid climate, intense radiation, and oxygen deficiency by developing special physiological features.  Migratory species such as the Ruddy shelduck are found in summer.

Other details
The lake is one of two high-altitude wetlands of India which have been designated as Ramsar sites.  Tourism seems to be having its effect on this pristine hidden paradise.

Tent accommodation is available  from the lake.

Gallery

References

External links 
Chandra Taal photos on Trek Earth
Trekking map 
Hampta Pass Chandratal Trek

Lakes of Himachal Pradesh
Cirques
Hiking trails in Himachal Pradesh
Glacial lakes of India
Geography of Lahaul and Spiti district
Ramsar sites in India
Protected areas established in 2005